Elections to Kesteven County Council were held on Saturday, 15 April 1961. Kesteven was one of three divisions of the historic county of Lincolnshire in England; it consisted of the ancient wapentakes (or hundreds) of Aswardhurn, Aveland, Beltisloe, Boothby Graffoe, Flaxwell, Langoe, Loveden, Ness, and Winnibriggs and Threo. The Local Government Act 1888 established Kesteven as an administrative county, governed by a Council; elections were held every three years from 1889, until it was abolished by the Local Government Act 1972, which established Lincolnshire County Council in its place.

The county was divided into 60 electoral divisions, each of which returned one member. In 1961 there were contests in 7 of these.

Results by division

Notes

References

1961
1961 English local elections
20th century in Lincolnshire